Below is list of the 62 Anglican schools in the state of New South Wales.

See also 

 List of non-government schools in New South Wales
 Anglican education in Australia

External links 
 Australian Anglican Schools Network website

Anglican